Mohamed Bin Ali Triki (born 1931) is a Tunisian government official who served as President of Les Scouts Tunisiens, as well as Chairman of the Arab Regional Scout Committee.

In 2002, he became a member of the World Scout Committee and promoted and hosted the 37th World Scout Conference and the 9th World Scout Youth Forum in Hammemet. The World Scout Committee appointed him to serve as liaison to the International Union of Muslim Scouts.

In 1999, he was awarded the 279th Bronze Wolf, the only distinction of the World Organization of the Scout Movement, awarded by the World Scout Committee for exceptional services to world Scouting.

References

External links

Recipients of the Bronze Wolf Award
1931 births
Scouting and Guiding in Tunisia
World Scout Committee members
Living people